Hugh Maitland Harvey "Red" Conn (October 25, 1904 in Hartney, Manitoba – July 19, 1964) was a Canadian ice hockey defenceman. He played in the National Hockey League for the New York Americans between 1933 and 1935. The rest of his career, which lasted from 1921 to 1941, was spent in the minor leagues.

Career statistics

Regular season and playoffs

External links

1904 births
1964 deaths
Boston Cubs players
Canadian ice hockey defencemen
Edmonton Eskimos (ice hockey) players
Ice hockey people from Manitoba
Moose Jaw Maroons players
New York Americans players
Philadelphia Arrows players
Portland Buckaroos players
Providence Reds players
Regina Capitals players
Springfield Indians players
Vancouver Lions players